And I'll Scratch Yours (originally announced as I'll Scratch Yours) is a compilation album developed by the English rock musician Peter Gabriel. Initially slated for release in 2010, the album was released on 24 September 2013. The original concept was that And I'll Scratch Yours would serve as a companion piece to Gabriel's 2010 covers album Scratch My Back. The idea was to give the artists whose songs Gabriel covered on Scratch My Back a medium to reciprocate – And I'll Scratch Yours would feature those artists covering Gabriel's songs. However, three artists (David Bowie, Neil Young, and Radiohead) declined to record covers of Gabriel's material. Therefore, three new artists (Brian Eno, Joseph Arthur, and Feist) contributed covers to the album instead.

Album history
And I'll Scratch Yours was originally announced and scheduled for release in 2010, but several artists failed to deliver material as promised, or declined to participate in the project altogether. The album was subsequently postponed, though six tracks from it were released on iTunes between January and June 2010, and two of those tracks have also appeared on vinyl, as B-sides. In October 2011, Gabriel stated that he had "given up" waiting for the remaining artists to contribute to the project, and was looking to have other artists record cover material so that he could release And I'll Scratch Yours sometime "next year" (i.e., 2012). Eventually, Feist and Joseph Arthur were recruited to cover for some of the missing artists, and the album was announced for release on 23 September 2013.

Tracks released in 2010
Twelve artists were covered by Gabriel on the Scratch My Back album; 13 if one includes the cover of The Kinks' "Waterloo Sunset" (written by Ray Davies) on the limited edition bonus disc. However, only six artists originally submitted reciprocal covers of Gabriel material in connection with I'll Scratch Yours. Gabriel originally intended to release Scratch My Back and I'll Scratch Yours simultaneously, but as completion of the latter dragged out, it was instead decided to release a series of double A-sided singles with one song from each album every new full moon during 2010 on iTunes. In order of release, the I'll Scratch Yours tracks were:

 "Not One of Us" – Stephin Merritt (30 January 2010)
 "Biko" – Paul Simon (28 February)
 "Come Talk to Me" – Bon Iver (30 March)
"Solsbury Hill" – Lou Reed (28 April)
"Mercy Street" – Elbow (27 May)
"I Don't Remember" – David Byrne (26 June)

On 17 April 2010 "The Book of Love" (by Gabriel) backed with "Not One of Us" (by Merritt) as well as "Flume" (by Gabriel) backed with "Come Talk to Me" (by Bon Iver) were released on 7" vinyl to independent record stores.

Later developments
Of the seven remaining artists covered on Scratch My Back, Radiohead, David Bowie, Neil Young, and Ray Davies declined to participate in the I'll Scratch Yours project. It was reported on a January 2010 Peter Gabriel podcast that Radiohead would cover "Wallflower" from Gabriel's fourth self-titled album. However, Gabriel subsequently reported in an interview in The Guardian that Radiohead had withdrawn from the project after hearing his version of their song "Street Spirit (Fade Out)".

Regina Spektor, Randy Newman and Arcade Fire did ultimately submit material to the project, albeit later than expected. Brian Eno who co-wrote "Heroes" with David Bowie, covered "Mother of Violence". In an October 2011 interview published in Rolling Stone, Gabriel said, "I've sort of given up waiting for the others ... So now I think that I might try to find three or four other people to cover my stuff so that I can make an album out of that, and then get that out next year in some form.".

Track listing
All songs written by Peter Gabriel except "Mother of Violence," written by Peter Gabriel and Jill Gabriel.

Personnel

 Tony Cousins – mastering
 Marc Bessant – design, cover
 Steve Gschmeissner – cover, back cover
 David Hiscock – Peter Gabriel bloodspot
 Anna Gabriel – artists photography (except Lou Reed, Stephin Merritt, Arcade Fire, Feist and Regina Spektor)
 Lou Reed – photography (Lou Reed)
 Alex Hammond – photography (Stephin Merritt)
 Korey Richey – photography (Arcade Fire)
 Ben Feist – photography (Feist)
 Jack Dishel – photography (Regina Spektor)
 Nige Tassell – sleeve notes

I Don't Remember
 David Byrne – vocals, instruments
 Patrick Dillett – mixing

Come Talk to Me
 Sean Carey – drums
 Rick Lockwood – voice
 Kimberly Lockwood – voice
 Justin Vernon – all other instruments

Blood of Eden
 Joe Mendelson – production, arrangement, instruments, mixing
 Jack Dishel – production, arrangement, instruments, vocals
 Regina Spektor – production, arrangement, instruments, vocals

Not One of Us
 Stephin Merritt – production, recording, mixing
 Charles Newman – production, recording, mixing

Shock the Monkey
 Joseph Arthur – moog guitar, bass

Big Time
 Bruno Coon – production, mixing

Games Without Frontiers
 Arcade Fire – production
 Mark Lawson – recording
 Korey Richey – recording
 Tom Elmhirst – mixing

Mercy Street
 Elbow – production
 Craig Potter – mixing

Don't Give Up
 Mocky – organ, synthesizer, production
 Leslie Feist – vocals, guitar, synthesizer, pedals, production
 Taylor Kirk – vocals, guitar
 Paul Taylor – percussion
 Mika Posen – violin
 Morri$ – production
 Renaud Letang – mixing
 Robbie Lackritz – recording, engineering

Solsbury Hill
 Lou Reed – production, mixing
 Eric Kramer – engineering
 Mike Rathke – additional guitar
 Sarth Calhoun – additional programming

Biko
 Mark Stewart – cello

References

2013 albums
Concept albums
Covers albums
Peter Gabriel albums
Real World Records albums